Superstar K4 is the fourth season of the South Korean television talent show series Superstar K, which premiered on 17 August 2012 on Mnet and airs every Friday night at 11PM KST. Lee Seung-Chul and Yoon Mi-Rae returned as judges, and were joined by singer/songwriter PSY who replaced Yoon Jong-Shin who had been a judge in the last two seasons.
2,083,447 applicants were recorded for this season, surpassing the record set by the previous season.

This program ended on November 23, 2012 with the announcement of Roy Kim as the winner and DickPunks as the runner-up.

Selection process
As with the previous seasons, applicants were able to apply via the internet, phone or in person. However, with this season, the options of applying via KakaoTalk and karaoke also became available.

Auditions
Preliminary Auditions for the 1st, 2nd and 3rd Regionals were held in these cities:

The Daegu, Daejeon and Jeju audition episodes were not aired due to scheduling changes.
The 3rd Regional auditions for the Los Angeles and New York were held together. 
Participants of the Sydney audition who made it to the 3rd Regional's were judged at Seoul instead.

SuperWeek

Finalists

TOP 12

Finals 
Due to the adoption of 12 finalists in Superstar K4 compared to 10 and 11 finalists in the previous seasons, the format was changed by which three finalists are eliminated in the first week, and two in the following three weeks till the Top 5 is reached (exceptions including the judges decision to save DickPunks in the Top 7 week). Judge PSY was replaced from the Top 9 week by singer Yoon Gun, due to his decision to commit to promoting his song 'Gangnam Style (강남스타일)' overseas. The elimination of a contestant will be determinant upon who has the lowest number of points: with 60 percent of the points from a live text poll, 30 percent from the judges' decision and 10 percent from a pre-broadcast online poll.

Top 12 – First Love

 Group performance: "사랑 만들기 (Making Love)" (Papaya)

Top 9 – Rivalry

 Group performance: "마지막 승부 (The Last Game)" (Kim Min-kyo)

Top 7 - Go Back

 Group performance: "고백 (Confession)" (Delly Spice)

Top 6 - My Style

 Group performance: "그대에게 (To You)" (무한궤도)

Top 4 - Audience Song of Choice 

 Special Stages: DickPunks and Hong Dae-Kwang: "Girl" (아스피린); Jung Joon-Young and Roy Kim: "Creep" (Radiohead)

Top 3 - Judge's Mission / Contestant's Favourite Song
Each contestant performed two songs: a song from the judge that each had been assigned to be coached from, and a song of personal choice. For the judge mission, DickPunks were assigned to the mentorship of Yoon Mi-Rae, Jung Joon-Young to Lee Seung-Chul and Roy Kim to Yoon Gun.

Top 2 - Song Rendition / Self-Written Song

Ratings

Ratings 

 TNmS

 AGB Nielsen Media Research

References

External links

 
2012 South Korean television seasons